In Christianity, Holy Wednesday  commemorates the Bargain of Judas as a clandestine spy among the disciples. It is also called Spy Wednesday, or Good Wednesday (in Western Christianity), and Great and Holy Wednesday (in Eastern Christianity).

In Western Christianity many churches of various denominations observe the tenebrae service on Holy Wednesday.

Biblical narratives 
In the New Testament account of Holy Week, after Palm Sunday, the Sanhedrin gathered and plotted to kill Jesus before the feast of Pesach. On the Wednesday before his death, Jesus was in Bethany, in the house of Simon the Leper. As he sat at the supper table with his disciples, a woman named Mary anointed Jesus' head and feet with a costly oil of spikenard. The disciples were indignant, asking why the oil was not instead sold and the money given to the poor. But Judas Iscariot wanted to keep the money for himself. Then Judas went to the Sanhedrin and offered to deliver Jesus to them in exchange for money. From this moment on, Judas sought an opportunity to betray Jesus.

In reference to Judas Iscariot's intent to betray Jesus, formed on Holy Wednesday, the day is sometimes called "Spy Wednesday". The word spy, as used in the term, means "ambush, ambuscade, snare". Additionally, among the disciples, Judas clandestinely was a spy and Wednesday was the day he chose to betray Christ.

Liturgy

Catholic Church

Today, the term "Tenebrae" refers to a Holy Week service usually held on Spy Wednesday that involves the gradual extinguishing of candles on a Tenebrae hearse, readings related to the Passion of Jesus, and the strepitus (loud noise).

Prior to the Second Vatican Council, the Tenebrae liturgy of matins and lauds of Maundy Thursday (Holy Thursday) used to be celebrated in the afternoon or evening of Good Wednesday. The name comes from the Latin word tenebrae, meaning darkness. In this service, all the candles on a special candelabra and on the altar were gradually extinguished except for one. This was then hidden and the church was left in complete darkness. A similar celebration of matins and lauds of Good Friday and Holy Saturday used to be held towards the close of each of the preceding days. This custom is still retained by those Catholic Churches which celebrate the pre-1955 Holy Week Reforms.

In the 1955 Holy Week Reform, the first 38 verses of the 22nd chapter of St. Luke were removed. Those 38 verses are retained in the Roman Catholic Churches which celebrate the pre-1955 Holy Week.

Methodist Churches
In traditional Methodist usage, The Book of Worship for Church and Home (1965) provides the following Collect for Spy Wednesday: 

On the evening of Spy Wednesday, many Methodist churches observe the Tenebrae service.

Anglican Churches
In the Protestant Episcopal Church in the United States, a member of the Anglican Communion, the office of Tenebrae is celebrated on Spy Wednesday.

Byzantine Rite
In the Byzantine Rite, the theme of Holy and Great Wednesday is the commemoration of the sinful woman who anointed Jesus before his crucifixion and Burial; a second theme is the agreement to betray Jesus made by Judas Iscariot.

The day begins at vespers to which may be joined the celebration of the Presanctified Liturgy; typically, this is now performed Tuesday morning or afternoon. At this service, many of the hymns sung at matins are repeated. The readings tell of the finding of Moses and the sufferings of Job. The Gospel tells a number of parables about the Second Coming, including the parable of the Wise and Foolish Virgins.

Later that evening (in parish practice) or early the following morning, the matins follows the special format known as the Bridegroom Service which is used the first three days of Holy Week. The Gospel is a passage from John 12 about Jesus revealing himself to some Greeks. Towards the end of matins, the Hymn of Kassiani is sung. The hymn, (written in the 9th century by Kassia) tells of the woman who washed Christ's feet in the house of Simon the Leper. Much of the hymn is written from the perspective of the sinful woman:

Where Byzantine music is used, the composition expresses the poetry so strongly that it often leaves many people in a state of prayerful tears. The Hymn can last upwards of 25 minutes and is liturgically and musically a highpoint of the entire year. 

At vespers, to which may be joined the celebration of the Presanctified Liturgy, and which, strictly speaking, is the liturgical beginning of Holy Thursday, many of the hymns sung at matins are repeated. The readings tell of Moses' killing of the Egyptian and Job refusing to curse God despite his misfortunes. The Gospel tells the stories of the sinful woman and Judas' betrayal.

In Greece (and some other places the custom has spread to) all members of the church receive Holy Unction on Wednesday evening.

It is on account of the agreement made by Judas to betray Jesus on this day that Orthodox Christians fast on Wednesdays (as well as Fridays) throughout the year.

Customs 

Czech Republic: the day is traditionally called Ugly Wednesday, Soot-Sweeping Wednesday or Black Wednesday, because chimneys used to be swept on this day, to be clean for Easter.
Malta: this day is known as L-Erbgħa tat-Tniebri (Wednesday of Shadows), referring to the liturgical darkness (tenebrae).  In the past children went to the parish church and drummed on the chairs to make the sound of thunderstorms, as their version of the "strepitus" sound at Tenebrae Wednesday.
A dymbil is a piece of wood. Historically, the metal clapper of the church bells were replaced by these dymbils on Holy Wednesday, to make a duller sound.

References

External links 
What Is Spy Wednesday during Holy Week? - Christianity.com

Eastern Orthodox liturgical days
Holy Week
Wednesday
Greek traditions
Articles containing video clips